Gemini Media was founded in 1979 by John H. Zwarensteyn in Grand Rapids, Michigan. The company's offices are located at 549 Ottawa Avenue NW, Grand Rapids, Michigan 49503.

History
Zwarensteyn had published Grand Rapids Magazine as a staff member of the Grand Rapids Area Chamber of Commerce during the 1970s and purchased the publication when the chamber decided to sell it in 1979.

In 1980 he bought out his partners and formed Gemini Publications. In 1983, Grand Rapids Magazine began to take on more of a consumer focus as Gemini began publishing the Grand Rapids Business Journal—first as a monthly business-to-business newspaper—then in 1986, as a weekly.

The Gemini Publications list of titles includes:

 Grand Rapids magazine (monthly)
 Michigan Blue (six times annually)

Acquired

On September 1, 2018, Gemini Publications was acquired by Hour Media of Detroit, Michigan. The new name of the company is Gemini Media LLC. In 2022, Crain Communications acquired the Grand Rapids Business Journal from Gemini.

References

Publishing companies of the United States
Companies based in Grand Rapids, Michigan
Publishing companies established in 1979